Grand National are a British band from London, England who have toured extensively throughout Europe and the United States. The project is a collaboration between Rupert Lyddon (born 1975, Amersham) and Lawrence Rudd (born 1976, Weston-super-Mare), who also is a DJ and remixer. Their sound is reminiscent of early forays into electronic sound manipulation, new wave and psychedelic soul. As a live act the band usually adopt a six-piece format.  There is also an unrelated group by the same moniker in the U.S.

Remixes
Grand National have provided remixes for Snow Patrol's track "Chocolate" from the 2003 Final Straw album and Client's "In It For The Money". Sasha reconstructed the track "Talk Amongst Yourselves" for his progressive house project that became the compilation Involver.

Discography

Albums

Singles and EPs

References

 Discogs biography

External links
Grand National on Myspace

British electronic music groups
British dance music groups
Remixers